Bangura is a surname. Notable people with the surname include:

Al Bangura, footballer
Alex Bangura, footballer
Alhassan Bangura, footballer
Alpha Bangura, basketball player
Mohamed Bangura (footballer)
Mohamed Bangura (boxer)
Mustapha Bangura, footballer
Shaka Bangura, footballer
Teteh Bangura, footballer
Umaru Bangura, footballer
Unisa Bangura, footballer
Zainab Bangura, politician and social activist

See also
Bangura, India